Institute of Philosophy can mean:

 Institute of Philosophy, KU Leuven (formerly the Higher Institute of Philosophy)
 Higher Institute of Philosophy, University of Louvain
 Institute of Philosophy, University of London
 Institute of Philosophy, Russian Academy of Sciences
 Institute of Philosophy, University of Warsaw